Sandor Bustamante (born September 30, 1999) is an American soccer player who plays as a midfielder.

Career 
Bustamante spent four years in the D.C. United Academy; scoring 2 goals in 37 match appearances.

He was signed by Loudoun United FC on March 8, 2019. Bustamante made his competitive debut for the club in its inaugural USL Championship match against Nashville SC. Following seven appearances for the club over the course of the season, Bustamante was not retained for the 2020 season.

References

External links
Sandor Bustamante at USL Championship Official Website
Sandor Bustamante at US Soccer Development Academy

1999 births
Living people
American soccer players
Association football midfielders
Loudoun United FC players
Soccer players from Alexandria, Virginia
Sportspeople from Alexandria, Virginia
USL Championship players